The Journey is the fourth album by R&B boy band Immature, released on September 23, 1997 on MCA Records. It peaked at #92 on The Billboard 200 chart and at #20 on the Top R&B/Hip-Hop Albums chart. This would be the last album under the name, Immature  before moving to their fifth album in 1999 as IMx.

Track listing
"Give Up the Ghost" (featuring Bizzy Bone)
"Tamika"
"I'm Not a Fool"
"Extra, Extra" (featuring Keith Sweat)
"Don't Ever Say Never"
"24/7"
"Can't You See"
"Ooh Wee Baby" (featuring Daz Dillinger)
"I'll Give You Everything"
"I Can't Wait"
"Bring Your Lovin' Home"
"Where Do We Go"
"All Alone"

References

1997 albums
IMx albums
MCA Records albums
Albums produced by Rodney Jerkins